Liwanag ng Hatinggabi (International title: Light of Midnight) is a Philippine television drama horror series broadcast by GMA Network. The series is the first installment of GMA Mini-Series. Directed by Joel Lamangan, it stars Lorna Tolentino, Angelika dela Cruz and Victor Neri. It premiered on December 6, 1999. The series concluded on March 27, 2000 with a total of 17 episodes. It was replaced by Tago Ka Na! in its timeslot.

Cast and characters
Lead cast
 Lorna Tolentino as Amanda
 Angelika dela Cruz as Luna
 Victor Neri as Gabriel

Supporting cast
 Boots Anson-Roa
 Raymond Bagatsing
 Glydel Mercado
 Mark Gil
 Chin Chin Gutierrez
 Ace Espinosa
 Gerald Madrid
 Krista Ranillo
 Carmi Martin
 Phillip Salvador
 Ana Capri
 Ronnie Lazaro
 Maureen Larrazabal

References

1999 Philippine television series debuts
2000 Philippine television series endings
Filipino-language television shows
GMA Network drama series
Television shows set in the Philippines